Elizabeth Brown is an American politician from the state of Indiana. A member of the Republican Party, she serves in the Indiana State Senate, representing Senate District 15.

Brown is a 1980 graduate of the University of Notre Dame, where she was a varsity athlete on the fencing team. She served on the City Council of Fort Wayne, Indiana for the At-Large district from 2008 to 2012, She ran when incumbent City Councilman, Sam Talarico, retired. Brown was succeeded by John Crawford. She ran for Mayor of Fort Wayne in 2011, but lost the primary. Brown was first elected to the Indiana Senate in 2014. She lost the primary to Jim Banks.

In the 2021 Legislative session, Senator Brown in her role as chair of the Judiciary Committee refused to allow a vote on Constitutional Carry to occur, effectively killing the measure for the year.

References

External links

Liz Brown at Ballotpedia

Living people
Republican Party Indiana state senators
People from Fort Wayne, Indiana
21st-century American politicians
Date of birth missing (living people)
Place of birth missing (living people)
Year of birth missing (living people)
21st-century American women politicians
Indiana city council members
Women city councillors in Indiana
Notre Dame Fighting Irish fencers
University of Iowa alumni
Women state legislators in Indiana